Mariatu Bala Usman is the commissioner for Ministry of Health, Katsina State. She is part of the Executive Council of Katsina State.

Career 
As commissioner of Health for Katsina State, Mariatu scheduled plans to eradicate meningitis that was first found on January 17, 2018 in the Bugaje ward of the Jibia local government area. She sent a squad to investigate and to give treatment, drugs and health education as a preventive measures. Mariatu highlighted that Katsina people had to travel for an hour to access healthcare in the paper titled  'Challenges facing health care delivery in Katsina State and the way forward'.

References

External links 
 Katsina State Government

Nigerian politicians
Living people
People from Katsina State
Hausa people
Nigerian women in politics
Year of birth missing (living people)